Marcin Wasilewski (born 1975 in Slawno, Zachodniopomorskie) is a Polish pianist and composer.

Wasilewski established a musical partnership with bassist Slawomir Kurkiewicz and drummer Michal Miskiewicz as the Simple Acoustic Trio in the early-1990s. Polish trumpeter Tomasz Stańko mentored the group for several years before recruiting the trio as his working band in 2001.

Discography

Marcin Wasilewski Trio

Appearances

References

1975 births
Living people
Avant-garde jazz musicians
Polish jazz pianists
Polish jazz composers
Male jazz composers
ECM Records artists
Male pianists
21st-century pianists
21st-century male musicians